Razi Barkai (Hebrew: רזי ברקאי; ‎ born 24 February 1949) is an Israeli media personality.

References

External links
http://www.icast.co.il/default.aspx?p=Podcast&id=395226&cid=395229 (in Hebrew)
http://www.themarker.com/markerweek/1.2466532 (In Hebrew)

Israeli mass media people
1949 births
Living people
Place of birth missing (living people)